Taishun County is a county in the prefecture-level city of Wenzhou, in the southern part of Zhejiang province, China, bordering Fujian province to the southeast, south, and west.

Taishun County has more than 900 covered bridges, many of them hundreds of years old, as well as a covered bridge museum. Wuyanling National Nature Reserve in the west of the county represents significant natural values as well as being a touristic attraction.

Administrative divisions
Towns:
Luoyang (罗阳镇), Baizhang (百丈镇), Sixi (泗溪镇), Yayang (雅阳镇), Shiyang (仕阳镇), Sankui (三魁镇), Xiaocun (筱村镇), Pengxi (彭溪镇)

Townships:
Siqian She Ethnic Township (司前畲族镇), Zhuli She Ethnic Township (竹里畲族乡)

Climate

References

External links
Taishun County photos

County-level divisions of Zhejiang
Geography of Wenzhou